Alibey Dam is a dam in Istanbul Province, Turkey, built between 1975 and 1983.

See also
List of dams and reservoirs in Turkey

External links

Alibey Dam at DSİ website

Dams in Istanbul Province
Dams completed in 1983